The electoral district of Eacham was a Legislative Assembly electorate in the state of Queensland. It was created in a redistribution ahead of the 1912 state election and existed until the 1932 state election.

Based in the Atherton Tableland west of Cairns, Eacham incorporated much of the former Electoral district of Woothakata.

Members for Eacham
The members for Eacham were:

See also
 Electoral districts of Queensland
 Members of the Queensland Legislative Assembly by year
 :Category:Members of the Queensland Legislative Assembly by name

References

Former electoral districts of Queensland
1912 establishments in Australia
1932 disestablishments in Australia
Constituencies established in 1912
Constituencies disestablished in 1932